Mount Madai is an inselberg in Kunak District, Sabah, Malaysia. The summit is 319 m above sea level. It has an approximate width .

References

Kunak District
Madai